Pushpalatha Jagannath is an Indian politician and the 21st mayor of Mysore between 2019-2020 and a former Deputy Mayor.

Career 
Jagannath is an Indian National Congress politician. In November 2018. In 2010 she became a Deputy Mayor of Mysore. She became the 21st Mayor of Mysore. She contested from ward no 11 at Mysore, where she contested for the second time.

References 

Living people
Indian National Congress politicians from Karnataka
Politicians from Mysore
Year of birth missing (living people)